Wanding, also known as Wanting (meaning in Tai Nüa language: "the sun shining overhead"), is a frontier town in Ruili City, Dehong Prefecture, Yunnan Province, China. Wanding is a town in the official division system, but there are three administrative systems in Wanding: county-level Wanding Economic Development Zone (畹町经济开发区), township-level Wanding Town government and Wanding Farm (畹町农场) government.

History
Wanding was developed after the Burma Road be built, as the terminal end of the road in China. It quickly grows into a border trade town between China and Burma after 1938. But the Japanese troops occupied Wanding in 1942 during World War II, it became depressed, until recovered by the Chinese Expeditionary Force on 19 January 1945. Wanding is also an important town on the Ledo Road, whose opening ceremony was held in Wanding on 28 January 1945. Soong Tse-ven, the premier of the Republic of China attended the ceremony. The town government was also established in early 1945.

Wanding upgraded to a county-level town in 1952 and established county-level Wanding City in 1985. The border trade at Wanding reached its peak in 1992, and then it declined. The reason is complicated, which includes the route change of China National Highway 320, the competition from the neighboring city Ruili, the national border trade policy adjustment, and the 1997 Asian financial crisis, etc. Thereafter, Wanding city was abolished in 1999, and a county-level Wanding Economic Development Zone of Ruili city was founded to replace the Wanding city. Wanding city was divided into three township-level divisions: Chengguan Town (城关镇), Hunban Township (混板乡), and Mangbang Township (芒棒乡). These three combined to a new town of Wanding in 2005, and it was the only township-level division under the economic development zone. In 2011, another township-level division, Wanding Farm, was transferred under the administration of the economic development zone from the Yunnan provincial farm system. Therefore, the economic development zone contains two township-level divisions now.

Geography
It is about 850 km from Kunming and the nearest airport is Mangshi in Luxi City. Wanding Town has three administrative villages and six village zoning units.

Border crossing
The China–Myanmar border runs to the south of the town, the nearest Myanmar town being Pang Hseng (Kyu-hkök) to the south across the Wanding River. There is a border checkpoint between Wanding and Pang Hseng, which functioned as the crossing from what was then known as Burma into China on the historic Burma Road and Ledo Road, with supplies transported from India and Burma into China during World War II.

Gallery

See also
Wanding Border Economic Cooperation Zone

References

External links
Bannacits

Towns of Yunnan
China–Myanmar border crossings
Divisions of Ruili